This list of solar eclipses visible from Russia enumerates the solar eclipses that have been seen and will be seen in Russia.

20th century (RSFSR and Russian Federation)

Total and annular eclipses 

 Solar eclipse of April 8, 1921 (Severnaya Zemlya archipelago)
 Solar eclipse of June 29, 1927 (northern Russia)
 Solar eclipse of June 19, 1936 (south of European Russia and Siberia)
 Solar eclipse of April 19, 1939 (Franz Josef Land, Ushakov Island and Vize Island)
 Solar eclipse of September 21, 1941 (south of European Russia)
 Solar eclipse of February 4, 1943 (Primorsky Krai)
 Solar eclipse of July 9, 1945 (European Russia)
 Solar eclipse of May 9, 1948 (Kuril Islands)
 Solar eclipse of September 12, 1950 (Russian Far East)
 Solar eclipse of February 25, 1952 (western Siberia)
 Solar eclipse of June 30, 1954 (south of European Russia)
 Solar eclipse of April 30, 1957 (north-east of European Russia)
 Solar eclipse of February 15, 1961
 Solar eclipse of July 20, 1963 (Kuril Islands)
 Solar eclipse of May 20, 1966 (south of European Russia)
 Solar eclipse of September 22, 1968 (the Urals)
 Solar eclipse of July 10, 1972 (Russian Far East)
 Solar eclipse of July 31, 1981 (southern Russia)
 Solar eclipse of July 22, 1990 (northern Russia)
 Solar eclipse of March 9, 1997 (Russian Far East)

Partial eclipses 
 Solar eclipse of June 8, 1918 (Russian Far East)
 Solar eclipse of March 28, 1922 (European Russia)
 Solar eclipse of September 10, 1923 (Chukchi Peninsula and Kamchatka Peninsula)
 Solar eclipse of August 30, 1924
 Solar eclipse of July 9, 1926
 Solar eclipse of June 17, 1928
 Solar eclipse of November 12, 1928
 Solar eclipse of April 18, 1931 (Siberia)
 Solar eclipse of September 12, 1931 (Chukchi Peninsula)
 Solar eclipse of August 31, 1932
 Solar eclipse of August 21, 1933 (European Russia, the Urals, southwestern Siberia)
 Solar eclipse of February 14, 1934 (Russian Far East)
 Solar eclipse of June 30, 1935
 Solar eclipse of November 21, 1938
 Solar eclipse of July 20, 1944 (south regions)
 Solar eclipse of April 28, 1949 (north-west of European Russia, northern Russia)
 Solar eclipse of February 14, 1953 (Russian Far East)
 Solar eclipse of June 20, 1955 (Primorsky Krai)
 Solar eclipse of December 14, 1955 (south regions)
 Solar eclipse of December 2, 1956
 Solar eclipse of April 19, 1958
 Solar eclipse of October 2, 1959 (European Russia)
 Solar eclipse of September 20, 1960 (Russian Far East)
 Solar eclipse of December 4, 1964 (Russian Far East)
 Solar eclipse of November 23, 1965
 Solar eclipse of May 9, 1967 (north of European Russia)
 Solar eclipse of February 25, 1971 (European Russia, the Urals)
 Solar eclipse of July 22, 1971 (Russian Far East)
 Solar eclipse of May 11, 1975 (all)
 Solar eclipse of April 29, 1976
 Solar eclipse of October 2, 1978
 Solar eclipse of July 20, 1982 (north of Russia)
 Solar eclipse of December 15, 1982 (European Russia, south-west of Siberia)
 Solar eclipse of May 19, 1985 (northeast Russia)
 Solar eclipse of September 23, 1987
 Solar eclipse of March 18, 1988 (eastern Siberia)
 Solar eclipse of December 24, 1992 (Russian Far East)
 Solar eclipse of May 21, 1993 (European Russia)
 Solar eclipse of May 10, 1994 (Chukchi Peninsula)
 Solar eclipse of October 24, 1995 (Siberia)
 Solar eclipse of October 12, 1996 (European Russia)
 Solar eclipse of August 11, 1999 (all Russia except Russian Far East)
 Solar eclipse of July 31, 2000 (northern Russia)

21st century

Total and annular eclipses 

 Solar eclipse of March 29, 2006 (south of European Russia)
 Solar eclipse of August 1, 2008 (western Siberia)
 Solar eclipse of June 10, 2021 (east of Yakutia)
 Solar eclipse of August 12, 2026 (Taymyr Peninsula)
 Solar eclipse of June 1, 2030
 Solar eclipse of March 30, 2033 (Chukotka Autonomous Okrug)
 Solar eclipse of June 21, 2039 (west part of European Russia)
 Solar eclipse of April 9, 2043 (Kamchatka Peninsula and Magadan Oblast)
 Solar eclipse of June 11, 2048 (European Russia)
 Solar eclipse of July 1, 2057 (Russian Far East)
 Solar eclipse of April 30, 2060 (south of Dagestan)
 Solar eclipse of April 20, 2061 (European Russia and Urals)
 Solar eclipse of August 24, 2063 (south of Primorsky Krai)
 Solar eclipse of June 22, 2066 (Kamchatka Peninsula, Chukchi Peninsula)
 Solar eclipse of September 12, 2072 (Siberia)
 Solar eclipse of July 13, 2075
 Solar eclipse of July 3, 2084 (north of Russia)
 Solar eclipse of April 21, 2088 (North Caucasus)
 Solar eclipse of May 11, 2097 (Murmansk Oblast)

Partial eclipses 

 Solar eclipse of June 10, 2002 (Russian Far East)
 Solar eclipse of May 31, 2003
 Solar eclipse of October 14, 2004 (Siberia)
 Solar eclipse of October 3, 2005 (European Russia)
 Solar eclipse of March 19, 2007 (Siberia and east of European Russia)
 Solar eclipse of July 22, 2009 (south of Siberia)
 Solar eclipse of January 15, 2010 (south of European Russia)
 Solar eclipse of January 4, 2011 (European Russia and south-west of Siberia)
 Solar eclipse of June 1, 2011 (Arctic and north-east of Siberia)
 Solar eclipse of May 20, 2012 (Siberia)
 Solar eclipse of October 23, 2014 (east regions of Russian Far East)
 Solar eclipse of March 20, 2015 (western Russia)
 Solar eclipse of March 9, 2016 (Khabarovsk Krai, Primorsky Krai, Sakhalin, Kamchatka and Chukchi peninsulas)
 Solar eclipse of August 21, 2017 (Chukchi Peninsula, north of Kamchatka Peninsula)
 Solar eclipse of August 11, 2018 (European Russia to north-east of Velikiye Luki–Moscow–Balakovo border and Siberia except east regions of Russia Far East)
 Solar eclipse of January 6, 2019 (Russian Far East)
 Solar eclipse of June 21, 2020 (south part of Russia)
 Solar eclipse of October 25, 2022 (European Russia)
 Solar eclipse of March 29, 2025 (?)
 Solar eclipse of August 2, 2027 (European Russia, except north-east part)
 Solar eclipse of June 12, 2029 (northern Russia)
 Solar eclipse of November 3, 2032 (?)
 Solar eclipse of March 20, 2034 (south-west part of Russia)
 Solar eclipse of September 2, 2035 (Siberia)
 Solar eclipse of August 21, 2036 (north-west part of Russia)
 Solar eclipse of January 16, 2037 (?)
 Solar eclipse of January 5, 2038 (Kaliningrad Oblast, Crimea)
 Solar eclipse of July 2, 2038 (Crimea, North Caucasus)
 Solar eclipse of October 25, 2041 (Russian Far East)
 Solar eclipse of April 20, 2042 (Russian Far East)
 Solar eclipse of August 23, 2044 (Siberia, north-east of European Russia)
 Solar eclipse of August 12, 2045 (Chukchi Peninsula)
 Solar eclipse of February 5, 2046 (Primorsky Krai)

22nd century

Total and annular eclipses 
 Solar eclipse of February 28, 2101
 Solar eclipse of July 15, 2102
 Solar eclipse of October 5, 2108
 Solar eclipse of May 24, 2115
 Solar eclipse of September 26, 2117
 Solar eclipse of March 22, 2118
 Solar eclipse of July 25, 2120
 Solar eclipse of May 14, 2124
 Solar eclipse of October 16, 2126
 Solar eclipse of August 15, 2129
 Solar eclipse of June 3, 2133
 Solar eclipse of April 1, 2136
 Solar eclipse of January 8, 2141
 Solar eclipse of May 25, 2142
 Solar eclipse of April 2, 2155
 Solar eclipse of August 5, 2157
 Solar eclipse of November 7, 2162
 Solar eclipse of August 25, 2166
 Solar eclipse of June 25, 2169
 Solar eclipse of October 29, 2171
 Solar eclipse of January 29, 2177
 Solar eclipse of June 16, 2178
 Solar eclipse of April 3, 2182
 Solar eclipse of September 4, 2184
 Solar eclipse of July 6, 2187
 Solar eclipse of August 26, 2193
 Solar eclipse of February 10, 2195
 Solar eclipse of June 26, 2196

Eclipses for major cities in next 10 years 
Cities with a population of more than one million people, Kaliningrad and the top five cities by population of the Far East are listed here. Obscuration and moment of time with maximum magnitude (UTC) are indicated. Annular and total eclipses in cities are market with bold.

Total and annular eclipses between 1001 and 2300 in cities

Chelyabinsk 
 1874 Oct 10 (Annular)
 2061 Apr 20 (Total)
 2141 Jan 8 (Annular)

Chita 
 1583 Dec 14 (Annular)
 1719 Feb 19 (Annular)
 1746 Mar 22 (Annular)
 1997 Mar 9 (Total)
 2057 July 1 (Annular)

Irkutsk 
 1661 Mar 30 (Total)
 1802 Aug 28 (Annular)
 1852 Dec 11 (Total)
 1887 Aug 19 (Total)
 2281 Jun 17 (Total)

Kaliningrad 
 2195 Feb 10 (Annular)

Kazan 
 1120 Oct 24 (Annular)
 1185 May 01 (Total)
 1236 Aug 03 (Annular)
 1261 Apr 01 (Annular)
 1487 Jul 20 (Total)
 1551 Aug 31 (Total)
 1708 Sep 14 (Total)
 1762 Oct 17 (Total)
 1827 Apr 26 (Annular)
 2195 Feb 10 (Annular)
 2214 Jul 08 (Total)
 2236 May 06 (Total)
 2249 Mar 15 (Annular)

Khabarovsk 
 1936 Jun 19 (Total)
 2124 May 14 (Total)
 2202 Sep 17 (Annular)

Krasnodar 
 1793 Sep 05 (Annular)
 1851 Jul 28 (Total)
 1936 Jun 19 (Total)
 2030 Jun 01 (Annular)
 2249 Mar 15 (Annular)

Krasnoyarsk 
 1692 Feb 17 (Annular)
 1773 Mar 23 (Annular)
 1829 Sep 28 (Annular)
 1887 Aug 19 (Total)
 2030 Jun 01 (Annular)
 2115 May 24 (Total)
 2276 Mar 16 (Annular)
 2287 Aug 10 (Annular)

Moscow 
 1415 Jun 07 (Total)
 1476 Feb 25 (Total)
 1518 Jun 08 (Annular)
 1827 Apr 26 (Annular)
 1887 Aug 19 (Total)
 2075 Jul 13 (Annular)
 2126 Oct 16 (Total)
 2195 Feb 10 (Annular)
 2296 Aug 29 (Annular)

Nizhny Novgorod 
 1236 Aug 03 (Annular)
 1270 Mar 23 (Annular)
 1331 Nov 30 (Total)
 1476 Feb 25 (Total)
 1489 Dec 22 (Annular)
 1518 Jun 08 (Annular)
 1551 Aug 31 (Total)
 1827 Apr 26 (Annular)
 2075 Jul 13 (Annular)
 2195 Feb 10 (Annular)

Novosibirsk 
 2008 Aug 01 (Total)
 2101 Feb 28 (Annular)
 2276 Mar 16 (Annular)

Omsk 
 1874 Oct 10 (Annular)
 1936 Jun 19 (Total)
 2030 Jun 01 (Annular)
 2120 Jul 25 (Annular)
 2142 May 25 (Total)
 2256 October 19 (Annular)
 2287 Aug 10 (Annular)

Perm 
 1739 Aug 4 (Annular)
 1887 Aug 19 (Total)
 2061 Apr 20 (Total)
 2141 Jan 8 (Annular)
 2142 May 25 (Total)
 2236 May 06 (Total)
 2249 Mar 15 (Annular)
 2256 October 19 (Annular)

Petropavlovsk-Kamchatsky 
 2066 Jun 22 (Annular)
 2124 May 14 (Total)
 2177 Jan 29 (Annular)
 2231 Mar 04 (Annular)

Rostov-on-Don 
 1870 Dec 22 (Total)
 1961 Feb 15 (Total)
 2030 Jun 01 (Annular)
 2061 Apr 20 (Total)
 2195 Feb 10 (Annular)
 2249 Mar 15 (Annular)

Samara 
 1842 Jul 08 (Total)
 1961 Feb 15 (Total)
 2061 Apr 20 (Total)
 2187 Jul 06 (Total)
 2214 Jul 08 (Total)
 2249 Mar 15 (Annular)

Saratov 
 2061 Apr 20 (Total)
 2126 Oct 16 (Total)
 2187 Jul 6 (Total)
 2195 Feb 10 (Annular)
 2249 Mar 15 (Annular)
 2296 Aug 29 (Annular)

St. Petersburg 
 1706 May 12 (Total)
 2126 Oct 16 (Total)
 2195 Feb 10 (Annular)
 2296 Aug 29 (Annular)

Ufa 
 1641 Nov 03 (Total)
 1842 Jul 08 (Total)
 1961 Feb 15 (Total)
 2061 Apr 20 (Total)
 2141 Jan 8 (Annular)

Vladivostok 
 2063 Aug 24 (Total)
 2118 Mar 22 (Annular)
 2129 Aug 15 (Annular)

Volgograd 
 1666 Jul 02 (Hybrid)
 1836 May 15 (Annular)
 1961 Feb 15 (Total)
 2030 Jun 01 (Annular)
 2048 Jun 11 (Annular)
 2061 Apr 20 (Total)
 2195 Feb 10 (Annular)
 2249 Mar 15 (Annular)
 2287 Aug 10 (Annular)

Voronezh 
 1827 Apr 26 (Annular)
 2048 Jun 11 (Annular)
 2187 Jul 06 (Total)
 2195 Feb 10 (Annular)
 2236 May 06 (Total)

Yakutsk 
 1775 Aug 26 (Annular)
 2057 Jul 1 (Annular)
 2072 Sep 12 (Total)

Yekaterinburg 
 1874 Oct 10 (Annular)
 1961 Feb 15 (Total)
 2061 Apr 20 (Total)
 2141 Jan 8 (Annular)
 2142 May 25 (Total)

References

External links

 The NASA solar eclipse calculator for Europe
 List of total or annular solar eclipses in Russia

Solar eclipses
Russia
Astronomical observatories in Russia
Solar eclipses